Głuszyca Górna  is a village in the administrative district of Gmina Głuszyca within Wałbrzych County, Lower Silesian Voivodeship, in south-western Poland, close to the Czech border.

During World War II, the Germans operated a forced labour camp in the village, in which they held hundreds of Italian prisoners of war.

References

Villages in Wałbrzych County